Lukáš Magera (born 17 January 1983, in Opava) is a Czech international footballer who plays as a striker. Since June 2018 he has been at FC Zbrojovka Brno, where he signed a two-year contract. In January 2020 he signed for Zápy He made his international debut on 5 June 2009 in a friendly against Malta.

Honours

Player
FC Baník Ostrava
 Czech First League: 2003–04
 Czech Cup: 2004–05
Mladá Boleslav
 Czech Cup: 2015–16

References

External links
 Official FCPTM profile 
 
 
 

1983 births
Living people
Sportspeople from Opava
Czech footballers
Czech Republic under-21 international footballers
Czech Republic international footballers
Czech First League players
FC Baník Ostrava players
SK Kladno players
FK Mladá Boleslav players
Liga I players
FC Zbrojovka Brno players
FC Politehnica Timișoara players
Expatriate footballers in Romania
Expatriate footballers in England
Czech expatriate footballers
Swindon Town F.C. players
English Football League players
Association football forwards
FC Dolní Benešov players